Henri Beaujean (19 July 1925 – 11 May 2021) was a politician from Guadeloupe who served in the French National Assembly from 1986 to 1988. He was born in Le Moule on 19 July 1925, and died there on 11 May 2021, at the age of 95.

References 

1925 births
2021 deaths
Deputies of the 8th National Assembly of the French Fifth Republic
Guadeloupean politicians
People from Le Moule
Rally for the Republic politicians